Zerum (also Romanized as Zerūm; also known as Zerem) is a village in Zarem Rud Rural District, Hezarjarib District, Neka County, Mazandaran Province, Iran. At the 2016 census, its population was 144, in 45 families.

References 

Populated places in Neka County